Zarnitsy is a rural locality (a khutor) in Prokhorovsky District, Belgorod Oblast, Russia. The population was 13 as of 2010. There are 2 streets.

Geography 
Zarnitsy is located 36 km southeast of Prokhorovka (the district's administrative centre) by road. Gagarino and Lisichki are is the nearest rural locality.

References 

Rural localities in Prokhorovsky District